Warangal Central Jail is a correctional facility in Warangal, Telangana, India.

Infrastructure 
Warangal Central Jail is located in an area spread across . It employs prisoners in handloom, agricultural, dairy activities etc. Jail is being shifted to adjacent to Mamnoor police battalion with  allocated.

Prison land has been handed over to the Telangana health department to build a multi super-specialty hospital.

References 

Prisons in Telangana
Warangal